The IFTA Film & Drama Awards took place at the Mansion House on 24 May 2015 in Dublin, honouring Irish film and television released in 2014.

Jim Sheridan received a Lifetime Achievement Award at the  Awards Ceremony which was presented by Sean Bean.	
Caroline Morahan hosted the film awards ceremony on 24 May.

Film Awards
The nominations for the IFTA Film & Drama Awards were announced on 29 April 2015.

Awards were presented in 27 categories.

Film categories
 Film
 Frank
 Glassland
 I Used to Live Here
 Noble
 Patrick's Day
 Song of the Sea

 Director in Film
 Frank - Lenny Abrahamson Glassland - Gerard Barrett
 Begin Again - John Carney
 Patrick's Day - Terry McMahon

 Script Film
Gerard Barrett - Glassland
 Frank Berry - I Used to Live Here
 Will Collins - Song of the Sea
 Terry McMahon - Patrick's Day

 Actor in a Lead Role in a Feature Film
 Moe Dunford - Patrick's Day
 Colin Farrell - Miss Julie 
 Michael Fassbender - Frank
 Jack Reynor - Glassland

 Actress in a Lead Role in a Feature Film
 Tara Breathnach - A Nightingale Falling
 Jordanne Jones - I Used to Live Here
 Simone Kirby - Jimmy's Hall
 Deirdre O'Kane - Noble

 Actor in a Supporting Role in a Feature Film
 Domhnall Gleeson - Frank
 Allen Leech - The Imitation Game
 James Nesbitt - Gold
 Andrew Scott - Pride

 Actress in a Supporting Role in a Feature Film
 Kerry Condon - Gold 
 Sinéad Cusack - Queen and Country
 Sarah Greene - Noble
 Catherine Walker - Patrick's Day

Irish Film Board Rising Star
 Caitríona Balfe
 Moe Dunford
 Dónal Foreman
 Sarah Greene

 George Morrison Feature Documentary 
 Blood Fruit - Ferndale Films
 In A House That Ceased To Be - Atlantic Film Alliance One Million Dubliners - Underground Films
 Road - DoubleBand Films
 Unbreakable - Ross Whitaker

 Short Film
 Boogaloo and Graham - Michael Lennox / Ronan Blaney / Brian Falconer
 I Am Here - David Holmes
 Rockmount - David Tynan Skunky Dog - James Fitzgerald

 Animation
 An Ode to Love - Matthew Darragh
 Fresh Cut Grass - Boulder Media
 Somewhere Down the Line - Julien Regnard The Ledge End of Phil (from accounting) - Paul Morris

International categories
 International Film sponsored by American Airlines
 '71
 Boyhood
 The Imitation Game
 The Theory of Everything

 International Actor
 Steve Carell - Foxcatcher
 Benedict Cumberbatch - The Imitation Game
 Jake Gyllenhaal - Nightcrawler
 Eddie Redmayne - The Theory of Everything

 International Actress
 Patricia Arquette - Boyhood
 Toni Collette - Glassland
 Jessica Chastain - Miss Julie
 Julianne Moore - Still Alice

Television Drama categories
 Best Drama – In Association with the BAI
 Charlie
 The Fall
 Game of Thrones
 Love/Hate
 Vikings

Director Drama
 David Caffrey - Love/Hate
 Ciaran Donnelly - Vikings
 Colm McCarthy - Peaky Blinders
 Dearbhla Walsh -  Penny Dreadful

Script Drama
 Stuart Carolan - Love/Hate
 Tommy Collins, Eoin McNamee, Paul Walker - An Bronntanas
 Colin Murphy - The Guarantee
 Colin Teevan - Charlie

Actor in a Lead Role in Drama
 Jamie Dornan - The Fall
 Aidan Gillen - Charlie
 Cillian Murphy - Peaky Blinders
 Tom Vaughan-Lawlor - Love/Hate

Actress in a Lead Role Drama
 Caitriona Balfe - Outlander
 Michelle Beamish - An Bronntanas
 Maria Doyle Kennedy - Corp + Anam
 Charlie Murphy - Love/Hate

Actor in a Supporting Role in Drama
 John Connors  - Love/Hate
 Liam Cunningham - Game of Thrones
 Stephen Rea - The Honourable Woman
 Andrew Scott - Sherlock: "His Last Vow"

Actress in a Supporting Role in Drama
 Charlotte Bradley - An Bronntanas
 Aisling Franciosi - The Fall
 Charlie Murphy - The Village
 Mary Murray  - Love/Hate

Craft/Technical categories (Film/TV Drama)
Costume Design
 Joan Bergin - Vikings
 Consolata Boyle - Miss Julie
 Lorna Marie Mugan  - Peaky Blinders
 Eimer Ní Mhaoldomhnaigh - Jimmy's Hall

Production Design 
 Tom Conroy - Vikings
 Mark Geraghty  - Vikings
 John Paul Kelly - The Theory of Everything
 Donal Woods - Downton Abbey

Editing 
 Úna Ní Dhonghaíle - The Missing
 Nathan Nugent - Frank
 Emer Reynolds -  One Million Dubliners
 Emer Reynolds  - Patrick's Day

Cinematography
 PJ Dillon  - Vikings
 Michael Lavelle  - Patrick's Day
 James Mather -  Frank
 Piers McGrail - Glassland

 Make-up & Hair Sponsored by M·A·C
 Jimi: All Is by My Side
 Frank 
 Ripper Street
 Vikings

Original Score 
 Ray Harman - Patrick's Day
 David Holmes - '71
 Stephen McKeon - Queen and Country 
 Stephen Rennicks  - Frank

Sound 
 The Canal
 Frank 
 Game of Thrones
 Patrick's Day

Television Awards
The nominations for the Television Awards were announced on 2 October 2015.

References

External links
Official Site

2015 in Irish television
12
2015 film awards
2015 television awards